Anuppur is a City in northeastern Madhya Pradesh state of central India. It is the administrative headquarters of the Anuppur tehsil and Anuppur District. Previously, it was in Shahdol district.

Geography
It has an average elevation of 505 metres (1,656 feet). The Son River and some of its tributaries run through Anuppur.
According to 2001 Census, the total population of Anuppur District is 667155, out of which 309624 are Scheduled tribes and 48376 are
Scheduled castes. In this manner, Anuppur District is a tribal dominated district.
Kotma is the largest city/town and Municipality in Anuppur district.

Demographics
 India census, Anuppur district has a population of 749,521. 2001 to 2011 population growth rate is 12.3%. Males constitute 52% of the population and females 48%.

References

External links
Anuppur : Official

 
Cities and towns in Anuppur district